MCB Islamic Bank is a Pakistani Islamic bank which is a subsidiary of MCB Bank. It was established in 14 September 2015.

References

Nishat Group
Banks established in 2015
Islamic banks of Pakistan
Companies based in Lahore
Pakistani companies established in 2015